Witiza can refer to:

 Wittiza (c. 687 – 710), the Visigothic King of Hispania from 694
 Benedict of Aniane (c. 747 – 821), saint born in France